Aufruf (Yiddish: אויפרוף ofrif, oyfruf, ufruf/ifrif or אויפרופן ofrifn), which in Yiddish means "calling up," is the Jewish custom of a groom being called up in the synagogue for an aliyah, the recitation of a blessing over the Torah.

In the Ashkenazic Jewish community the aufruf ceremony is typically held on the Shabbat before the wedding; but it can also be held on a Monday or Thursday. In modern Hebrew and in the Sephardic and Mizrachi traditions, it is called Shabbat Hatan, the groom's Sabbath, and it is typically held on the Shabbat before the wedding.

After the Torah reading, the congregation sings a congratulatory song and the women throw candy at the groom. In non-Orthodox congregations, the bride and groom may be called up to the Torah together. It is customary for the family of the groom to invite the congregation to a festive kiddush after the services.

In many Ashkenazi Orthodox communities, the bride typically does not attend the aufruf because it is customary for the bride and groom to refrain from seeing each other for one week before the wedding. On the Shabbat preceding the wedding, there is also a custom for the bride's family and friends to gather to celebrate the bride and bring her joy. This is called a Shabbat Kallah, the bride's Sabbath.

See also
Jewish views on marriage

References

Marriage in Judaism
Shabbat
Yiddish words and phrases in Jewish law